Kenwood Depot was a railway station in Kenwood, California. It opened in 1887 as South Los Guilicos, and shares some features with the San Carlos station on the San Francisco Peninsula which was built around the same time. The station building was the only stone depot constructed for the Santa Rosa and Carquinez Railroad and cost $11,500 — tracks were on the east side. The station's name was changed to Kenwood in 1895 with the rest of the town. Rail service continued until 1936, and the rail line was removed in 1942. In 1940, Southern Pacific sold the depot to the Kenwood Improvement Club for $500 and it was converted into a community center. It was designated a Sonoma County Historic Landmark in 1980.

References

External links
 The Kenwood Depot Website

Railway stations in Sonoma County, California
Railway stations in the United States opened in 1887
Railway stations closed in 1936
Former Southern Pacific Railroad stations